Saint Meneleus (or Mauvier, Menele, Meneve, Menevius, Ménélée; died 720) was a French monk who founded the Menat Abbey.

12th-century sources

According to the 12th-century Vita Menelei and Vita S. Theofredi, Meneleus was descended from the Roman emperor Heraclius.
He fled from home to avoid a marriage and met Theofredus, abbot of Saint-Chaffre.
Meneleus entered this monastery and was trained by the abbot for several years.
An angel then directed him to return to the spot where he had met Theofredus, where he fell asleep below an oak.
The angel reappeared an told him to build a monastery on the spot, which became Menat Abbey.
His female relatives could not live without him, and after a desperate search found him at Menat.
Lisseul.

Monks of Ramsgate accounts

The monks of St Augustine's Abbey, Ramsgate wrote in their Book of Saints (1921),

Butler's account

The hagiographer Alban Butler (1710–1773) wrote in his Lives of the Fathers, Martyrs, and Other Principal Saints under April 12,

Notes

Sources

 

 

8th-century Frankish saints
720 deaths